Hyblaea fortissima is a moth in the family Hyblaeidae described by Butler in 1881.

References

Hyblaeidae